SH760 may refer to:

 Shanghai SH760, an automobile produced in China
 State Highway 760